Choreutis cunuligera is a moth of the family Choreutidae. It is known from China (Guizhou, Zhejiang) and Japan (Honshu).

The wingspan is about 12 mm for males and 11 mm for females. The head is fuscous mixed with yellowish. The thorax is greyish-fuscous with a purple gloss, an ochreous anterior and a broader subapical band. The abdomen fuscous, although the posterior halves of the segments are ochreous. The forewings are ovate-triangular and greyish-fuscous, with a purple gloss. The markings are ochreous, gently becoming brighter posteriorly and white on the costa. There is a cloudy ochreous suffused spot on the base of the wing. The hindwings are fuscous with a golden gloss and a central dilated broad bar and an irregular ochreous spot before and opposite termen before the tornus.

Etymology
The name is derived from cunula (meaning a small cradle) and gero (meaning to bear).

References

Choreutis
Moths of Japan